Andrew Noakes is an Associate Senior Lecturer in journalism, specialising in automotive journalism, at the Coventry University Department of Media and Communication.

Early career
An award-winning motoring journalist, author and photographer, he originally trained as an engineer at Loughborough University. After two years of working as a freelance motoring journalist he joined Fast Car, where he concentrated on technical articles and in-depth product tests. He quickly rose to the position of Deputy Editor.

In 1996 Andrew became editor of Retro, a magazine for modified classic cars, re-launching the magazine a year later as Classics, now  Classics Monthly. He became editor-in-chief in 2000 overseeing Classics and the launch of a new internet magazine.

Freelance motoring journalism
He returned to freelance writing in 2002 and has written for numerous car magazines including CAR, Auto Express, Classic & Sports Car, Classic Cars, Classic Car Weekly, Redline, Total Impreza, Total Evolution, V Magazine, BMW Magazine and European Automotive Design. He has contributed to automotive websites CAR Online and PistonHeads.com and runs his own website, andrewnoakes.com.

He has written or contributed to a dozen books on motoring and motorsport.  His latest, Ford Cosworth DVF: The Inside Story of F1s Greatest Engine, was awarded the Guild of Motoring Writers Timo Makinen Trophy in 2007.

In 2011, he launched the online automotive technology magazine CarTechnical.co.uk.

References

External links
 
 Coventry University profile

Living people
British magazine editors
Year of birth missing (living people)
Place of birth missing (living people)
Alumni of Loughborough University
Academics of Coventry University